The Walkerton Capitals are a Junior ice hockey team based in Walkerton, Ontario, Canada.  They played in the Western Junior C Hockey League. until the 2016-17 season when the league became a division became the Pollock Division of the Provincial Junior Hockey League.

History 
The Walkerton Blackhawks entered the Central Ontario Junior C Hockey League in 1976, jumping up from Junior D.  The Hawks finished that season with a moderate 11-24-1 record as an expansion franchise and had their first playoff berth.

In 1980, the Central League became the Grey-Bruce Junior C Hockey League as many of the further reaching teams like the Listowel Cyclones and New Hamburg Hahns left the league to pursue Junior B hockey.

In 1987, the league accepted the expansion of the Mount Forest Patriots and in 1988 renamed itself the Western Ontario Junior C Hockey League.  The Walkerton Hawks have been a long running mainstay in this league.  They sat out the 2004-05 season to reorganize their franchise, but have come back strong since.  During their time off, ownership considered a move to Saugeen Shores, Ontario.

In the 2005-06 season, their first after their short hiatus, the Walkerton Hawks finished in fifth place.  They challenged the fourth-seeded Goderich Sailors in the league quarter-final and defeated them 2-games-to-none.  In the league semi-final, they competed against the league's top seeded Wingham Ironmen.  The Ironmen swept the series 4-games-to-none.

The 2006-07 season saw the Walkerton Hawks step into high gear at the end of the season and push into the third seed over the Hanover Barons.  In the league quarter-final, the Hawks played against the sixth seeded Goderich Sailors.  Walkerton won the series 3-games-to-1.  In the semi-final, the Hawks drew the second seeded Wingham Ironmen.  To the dismay of the Ironmen, the Hawks swept them 4-games-to-none.  This resulted in Western league final between the Walkerton Hawks and the first seeded Kincardine Bulldogs.  This was the end of the road for the Hawks as the Bulldogs came out on top 4-games-to-1.

The playoffs for the 2019-20 season were cancelled due to the COVID-19 pandemic, leading to the team not being able to play a single game.

May 20, 2022 the team announced that they were re-branding the club to the Walkerton Capitals

Season-by-season standings 

(*) The 1999-00 Season was altered drastically due to the folding of the Lakeshore Pirates.  As a disproportionate number of games had been played by each team against Lakeshore, all history of these games was erased.
1976-1981 & 1982-1996
1981-1982
1996-2004
2004–Present

Notable alumni 
Kevin Czuczman
Lauchlin Elder (NLL lacrosse player)
Nathan Perrott

References

External links 
 Hawks Webpage

Ice hockey teams in Ontario